Suffolk County Cricket Club is one of twenty minor county clubs within the domestic cricket structure of England and Wales. It represents the historic county of Suffolk.

The team is currently a member of the Minor Counties Championship Eastern Division and plays in the MCCA Knockout Trophy. Suffolk played List A matches occasionally from 1966 until 2005 but is not classified as a List A team per se.

Honours
 Minor Counties Championship (3) – 1946, 1977, 1979; shared (1) – 2005
 MCCA Knockout Trophy (1) – 2007

Home grounds
Old London Road, Copdock
The Park, Exning
Ransomes and Reavell Sports Club Ground, Ipswich
Victory Ground, Bury St Edmunds
Wamil Way, Mildenhall
Woodbridge School, Woodbridge

Former grounds
Cemetry Road, Bury St Edmunds
Denes Oval, Lowestoft

Earliest cricket

Cricket had probably reached Suffolk by the end of the 17th century. The earliest known reference to cricket in Suffolk was in 1743.

The first county match was Norfolk v Suffolk at Bury St Edmunds Race Course on Thursday 23 August 1764, which was won by Norfolk. This was reported in the Gazetteer & London Daily Advertiser on Tuesday 28 August. More games against Norfolk followed.

Origin of club
A county organisation was formed on 27 July 1864 and a county side took part in the Minor Counties Championship from 1904 to 1914, with no great success. The present Suffolk CCC was founded in August 1932 and rejoined the Minor Counties Championship in 1934.

Club history
Suffolk has won the Minor Counties Championship four times, one of them shared. It won outright in 1946, 1977 and 1979. Its most recent success was a shared title with Cheshire in 2005.

SCCC played their first game at Lord's on (bank holiday) Monday, 27 August 2007 in the Minor Counties Knock-out Final, winning the trophy for the first time.

Notable players
The following Suffolk cricketers also made an impact on the first-class game:

 Phil Mead
 Robin Hobbs
 Derek Randall
 Devon Malcolm
 Cyril Perkins
 Philip Caley

References

External links
 Club website
 Minor Counties Cricket Association Official Site
 Play Cricket – Suffolk

Further reading
 Rowland Bowen, Cricket: A History of its Growth and Development, Eyre & Spottiswoode, 1970
 G B Buckley, Fresh Light on 18th Century Cricket, Cotterell, 1935
 Arthur Haygarth, Scores & Biographies, Volume 2 (1827–1840), Lillywhite, 1862
 Arthur Haygarth, Scores & Biographies, Volume 3 (1841–1848), Lillywhite, 1862
 Playfair Cricket Annual – various editions
 Wisden Cricketers' Almanack – various editions

 
National Counties cricket
History of Suffolk
Cricket clubs established in 1932
Cricket in Suffolk
1932 establishments in England